Tino Pietrogiovanna (born 19 December 1950) is a retired Italian alpine skier and alpine ski coach.

Biography
After his skiing career he began his career as a coach.

See also
Valanga azzurra

References

External links

1950 births
Living people
Italian male alpine skiers
Place of birth missing (living people)
20th-century Italian people
Italian alpine skiing coaches